NFL is a series of American football games that are developed by Gameloft, which is supposed to be a simulation of the National Football League. The game series is released on iOS, as well as Palm, and was originally released on the Nintendo DS. The series first came on the DS as NFL 2009 in 2008. Starting with NFL Pro 2012, the game became free, even though players still have to pay for extra XP. 2012 is also the first game to have experience points, team points, which can be used to boost players, as well as credits, which can be earned by leveling up, as well as watching Gameloft trailers. In NFL Pro 2013, when the player is in a passing play, the camera will zoom into a first-person view from the quarterback's perspective.

Games
 NFL 2009
 NFL 2010 (HD)
 NFL 2011 HD
 NFL Pro 2012
 NFL Pro 2013
 NFL Pro 2014

Players
The series, along with the agreement with the NFL, also has an agreement with the NFL Players Association. Along with this, the game also has "cover players", who appear on the title screen, with 2009 having players on the game cover.

Reception

The series received mixed reviews from players and critics alike, saying that the NFL license was a good touch, but the artificial intelligence makes the game very difficult. Gamezebo gave NFL Pro 2012 2 stars out of 5, saying that the defensive AI was "atrocious", as well as the freemium model.  PC World gave the game 3 stars out of 5, praising the control scheme and graphics, while noting the cost. 148Apps gave the 2011 game a 3.5 out of 5 star "drab football" grade, questioning the need for celebrations after a gain of more than 10 yards. IGN gave the 2011 edition a 5.5 "Mediocre" grade, praising the gameplay on the iPhone 4, while criticizing the poor controls and weak passing. Pocket Gamer stated that NFL Pro 2014 is “more disappointing than an afternoon spent watching the Pro Bowl.”

References

External links
 NFL 2010 Web Page
 NFL 2011 HD Web Page

Video games developed in France
Gameloft games
Vivendi franchises
National Football League video games
Nintendo DS games
IOS games
Android (operating system) games